Carassauga is an annual multicultural festival in Mississauga, Ontario.   Carassauga is a three-day event occurring annually in May.

Funded in 1985, Carassauga features cultural pavilions representing different countries and cultures.

History 

Carassauga is an incorporated  non-profit volunteer community organization. The festival was developed in response to a challenge from former Mayor Hazel McCallion in 1985.  Carassauga  is meant to reflect the ethnic and racial diversity of Mississauga

Pavilions 

The Carassauga  Cultural Pavilions are located in cultural and recreation centres throughout Mississauga.  

Each pavilion provide  food, entertainment, art, historical displays and vendors that represent a different culture.  Performances at the pavilions  may include dance, music, singing, fashion shows, and plays.  The pavilions also offer dance lessons, arts and crafts, and cooking demos.

References 
Mississauga.com/carassauga-returns-to-mississauga/

http://onthego.to/take-your-taste-buds-around-the-world/

External links 
 Official site

Festivals established in 1985
Festivals in Ontario
Festivals of multiculturalism
Multiculturalism in Canada
Tourist attractions in Mississauga
1985 establishments in Ontario
Culture of Mississauga